Pete Earley (born September 5, 1951) is an American journalist and author who has written non-fiction books and novels.

Career 
Born in Douglas, Arizona, Earley became a Washington Post reporter and also wrote books about the Aldrich Ames and John Walker espionage cases. His book Circumstantial Evidence: Death, Life, and Justice in a Southern Town (1995), about the wrongful conviction of Walter McMillian in Alabama, won an Edgar Award from the Mystery Writers of America for Best Fact Crime Book in 1996.

His book about the John Walker spy ring, Family of Spies, was a New York Times bestseller. It was adapted as a CBS miniseries starring Powers Boothe and Lesley Ann Warren.  In 2007, Earley was a finalist for a Pulitzer Prize for his book Crazy: A Father's Search Through America's Mental Health Madness, about a man seeking help for his son.

His 2008 book, Comrade J, is about Russian SVR defector Sergei Tretyakov.

Family 
Pete's older sister, Alice Lee Earley, died at the age of 17 on June 14, 1966, after being hit by a car while riding Pete's scooter. (Pete was 14 years old and at church camp when his sister was killed.) Years later, in a 1985 Washington Post article called "To Find a Sister" (1985), Earley wrote about Alice's death and its effect on his life. (As part of it, he interviewed the woman driver who had hit his sister.)

Bibliography

Non-fiction 
 Family of Spies: Inside the John Walker Spy Ring, Bantam (October 1, 1988), 
 Prophet of Death: The Mormon Blood Atonement Killings, William Morrow & Co (October 1991), 
 The Hot House: Life Inside Leavenworth Prison, Bantam (February 1, 1992), 
 Circumstantial Evidence: Death, Life, and Justice in a Southern Town, Bantam (August 1, 1995), 
 Confessions of A Spy: The Real Story of Aldrich Ames, Putnam (February 10, 1997), 
 Super Casino: Inside the "New" Las Vegas, Bantam (January 4, 2000), 
 WITSEC: Inside The Federal Witness Protection Program, Bantam (January 29, 2002), 
 Crazy: A Father's Search Through America's Mental Health Madness, Berkley (April 3, 2007), 
 Comrade J: The Untold Secrets of Russia's Master Spy in America After the End of the Cold War, Putnam (January 24, 2008), 
 The Serial Killer Whisperer: How One Man's Tragedy Helped Unlock the Deadliest Secrets of the World's Most Terrifying Killers, Touchstone (January 10, 2012), 
 Resilience: Two Sisters and a Story of Mental Illness by Jessie Close and Pete Earley, Grand Central Publishing, (January 13, 2015),

Fiction 
The Big Secret, Forge Books (June 1, 2004), 
Lethal Secrets, Forge Books (June 1, 2005), 
The Apocalypse Stone, Forge Books (June 13, 2006), 
Duplicity: A Novel, Center Street Press (October 2015), co-author Newt Gingrich 
Treason: A Novel, Center Street Press (October 2016), co-author Newt Gingrich 
 Vengeance: A Novel, Center Street Press (October 10, 2017), co-author Newt Gingrich, 
 Collusion: A Novel, Broadside Books (April 30, 2019), co-author Newt Gingrich, 
 Shakedown: A Novel, Broadside Books (March 24, 2020), co-author Newt Gingrich,

References

External links 
 
 

1951 births
American male journalists
People from Douglas, Arizona
American political writers
Living people